Acanthocinus angulosus is a species of longhorn beetles of the subfamily Lamiinae. It was described by Casey in 1913, and is known from North America.

References

Beetles described in 1913
Acanthocinus